Daisy Does America is a hybrid reality/comedy series that premiered on TBS on 6 December 2005. The show, similar to British actress and comedian Daisy Donovan's previous outing for British television Daisy, Daisy, was adapted for US audiences by actors Courteney Cox Arquette and David Arquette for their Coquette Productions and distributed by Warner Bros. Television.

In this unscripted programme, Donovan attempts to follow the "American Dream" by blending in with ordinary people while at the same time poking fun at the individuals with whom she is working.

Daisy Does America aired on LIVING2 in the UK, TV2 in New Zealand and UKTV in Australia

Episode guide
Episode 1 - "Bounty hunter"
Episode 2 - "Country & Western Singer"
Episode 3 - "Rap Star"
Episode 4 - "Pageant  Contestant"
Episode 5 - "Dog Show Handler"
Episode 6 - "Wedding Planner"
Episode 7 - "Poker Pro"
Episode 8 - "Psychic"
Episode 9 - "Magician's assistant"

Concept
Similar in concept to Da Ali G Show, Daisy features a confused Brit who asks irreverent questions of unsuspecting Americans.

External links

2005 American television series debuts
2006 American television series endings
2000s American reality television series
Television series by Warner Bros. Television Studios
TBS (American TV channel) original programming
English-language television shows